Nick Robertson (born 3 June 1995) is an Australian rules football player. Between 2014 and 2019, he played for the Brisbane Lions in the Australian Football League (AFL). Robertson was drafted by the Lions with pick 34 in the 2013 AFL Draft.  He made his debut against Port Adelaide in round 4 of the 2014 season. In October 2019, the Lions informed Robertson that he would not be offered a contract for the 2020 AFL season.
Robertson is playing for East Perth in the 2022 WAFL season.

References

External links

 

1995 births
Living people
Brisbane Lions players
Australian rules footballers from Western Australia